Bumi Sriwijaya Station (formerly Palembang Icon Station) is a station of the Palembang LRT Line 1, located in Ilir Barat I, Palembang.

The station is close to the Bumi Sriwijaya Stadium and the Palembang Icon Mall. The station became one of six stations that opened at the Palembang LRT launch on 1 August 2018.

Station layout

References

Palembang
Railway stations in South Sumatra
Railway stations opened in 2018